The 2008 Houston Dynamo season was the third season of the existence for the Houston franchise. The Houston Dynamo were the defending back-to-back MLS Cup Champions, and sought to become the first club in Major League Soccer history to win three straight MLS Cups.  It was the team's third season with head coach Dominic Kinnear, majority owner Philip Anschultz, president Oliver Luck, and chief operating officer Chris Canetti.

In the MLS regular season, the Dynamo finished first in the Western Conference to qualify for the playoffs for the third consecutive season.  In the MLS Cup Playoffs, Houston lost to the New York Red Bulls 4–1 on aggregate in the Conference Semifinals. They were eliminated by the Charleston Battery in the third round of the U.S. Open Cup.  During the 2008 CONCACAF Champions' Cup, Houston defeated C.S.D. Municipal 3–1 on aggregate in the quarterfinals before falling in the semifinals 3–0 to Deportivo Saprissa.  During the 2008 North American SuperLiga, the Dynamo reached the final, where they lost 6–5 on penalties to the New England Revolution.  The Dynamo also played in the group stage of the 2008–09 CONCACAF Champions League during the season, finishing second in their group to advance.

Major events

Team news
The new complex will provide 18 fields for local soccer organizations and will also afford the area the opportunity to host amateur tournaments of state, regional and national stature. Once completely developed, the complex is expected to attract well over 500,000 visitors per year.
 On February 26, 2008 Houston Dynamo President Oliver Luck revealed the planned negotiations to the media stating that the Houston Dynamo would be managed in majority by original owners Anschutz Entertainment Group (who will hold 50% of ownership) along with newfound partners Gabriel Brener, head of Brener International Group, and multiple World and Olympic boxing champion Oscar De La Hoya (each with 25% ownership).

Final roster

Appearances and goals are totals for MLS regular season only.

Player movement

In
Per Major League Soccer and club policies terms of the deals do not get disclosed.

Out
Per Major League Soccer and club policies terms of the deals do not get disclosed.

Coaching staff

Source

Pre-season

Friendlies

Pan-Pacific Championship

Texas Pro Soccer Festival

Competitions

Major League Soccer

Standings

Western Conference

Overall

Results summary

Results by round

Match results

MLS Cup Playoffs

U.S. Open Cup

CONCACAF Champions' Cup

Quarterfinals

Semifinals

North American SuperLiga

CONCACAF Champions League

Group stage

Championship Round 

After finishing 2nd in group B, the Dynamo qualified for the Championship Round.  The fixtures for the Championship Round are included in the Dynamo's 2009 season.

Player statistics

Appearances, goals, and assists 
{| class="wikitable sortable" style="text-align:center;"
|+
! rowspan="2" |
! rowspan="2" |
! rowspan="2" |
! rowspan="2" |
! colspan="3" |
! colspan="3" |
! colspan="3" |
! colspan="3" |
! colspan="3" |
! colspan="3" |
! colspan="3" |
|-
!!!!!!!!!!!!!!!!!!!!!!!!!!!!!!!!!!!!!!!!!
|-
|1||GK||||align=left|||11||0||0||7||0||0||0||0||0||1||0||0||1||0||0||0||0||0||2||0||0
|-
|2||DF||||align=left|||29||0||0||20||0||0||2||0||0||0||0||0||3||0||0||1||0||0||3||0||0
|-
|3||MF||||align=left|||1||0||0||0||0||0||0||0||0||1||0||0||0||0||0||0||0||0||0||0||0
|-
|4||DF||||align=left|||27||0||1||17||0||1||0||0||0||0||0||0||2||0||0||3||0||0||5||0||0
|-
|5||FW||||align=left|||8||0||0||4||0||0||0||0||0||1||0||0||0||0||0||1||0||0||2||0||0
|-
|6||MF||||align=left|||3||0||0||0||0||0||0||0||0||1||0||0||0||0||0||0||0||0||2||0||0
|-
|7||FW||||align=left|||19||2||0||8||0||0||0||0||0||1||0||0||4||1||0||4||0||0||2||1||0
|-
|8||MF||||align=left|||33||0||4||23||0||4||2||0||0||0||0||0||4||0||0||0||0||0||4||0||0
|-
|9||MF||||align=left|||44||4||8||30||3||5||2||0||0||0||0||0||3||0||0||5||1||2||4||0||1
|-
|10||FW||||align=left|||19||6||2||10||2||2||2||1||0||0||0||0||0||0||0||2||1||0||5||2||0
|-
|10||FW||||align=left|||17||2||2||10||2||1||0||0||0||1||0||1||4||0||0||2||0||0||0||0||0
|-
|11||MF||||align=left|||35||3||11||26||3||8||2||0||0||0||0||0||1||0||0||5||0||3||1||0||0
|-
|13||MF||||align=left|||41||3||1||25||2||1||2||0||0||0||0||0||4||0||0||5||1||0||5||0||0
|-
|14||MF||||align=left|||39||11||5||24||7||2||2||0||0||0||0||0||4||2||0||4||1||2||5||1||1
|-
|16||DF||||align=left|||26||2||4||14||0||3||0||0||0||0||0||0||3||0||0||5||0||1||4||2||0
|-
|17||MF||||align=left|||5||0||0||0||0||0||0||0||0||1||0||0||0||0||0||1||0||0||3||0||0
|-
|18||GK||||align=left|||38||0||0||24||0||0||2||0||0||0||0||0||3||0||0||5||0||0||4||0||0
|-
|19||MF||||align=left|||2||0||0||0||0||0||0||0||0||1||0||0||0||0||0||0||0||0||1||0||0
|-
|20||MF||||align=left|||36||1||5||23||1||2||1||0||0||1||0||0||2||0||0||5||0||2||4||0||1
|-
|21||FW||||align=left|||1||0||0||0||0||0||0||0||0||1||0||0||0||0||0||0||0||0||0||0||0
|-
|22||MF||||align=left|||37||7||6||27||3||4||2||0||0||1||0||0||0||0||0||2||3||0||5||1||1
|-
|23||MF||||align=left|||2||1||0||0||0||0||0||0||0||1||1||0||0||0||0||0||0||0||1||0||0
|-
|24||DF||||align=left|||41||0||1||26||0||0||2||0||0||0||0||0||4||0||0||5||1||0||4||0||0
|-
|25||FW||||align=left|||35||14||7||25||13||5||2||0||0||0||0||0||4||0||0||5||0||1||4||0||0
|-
|26||MF||||align=left|||39||2||4||22||1||1||1||0||0||1||0||0||4||0||1||5||1||0||6||0||2
|-
|27||MF||||align=left|||23||5||4||14||4||4||2||0||0||0||0||0||0||0||0||2||1||0||5||0||0
|-
|30||GK||||align=left|||0||0||0||0||0||0||0||0||0||0||0||0||0||0||0||0||0||0||0||0||0
|-
|32||DF||||align=left|||43||3||1||29||1||1||2||0||0||0||0||0||3||0||0||5||2||0||4||0||0
|-
|99||FW||||align=left|||0||0||0||0||0||0||0||0||0||0||0||0||0||0||0||0||0||0||0||0||0

Disciplinary record 

{| class="wikitable sortable" style="text-align:center;"
|+
! rowspan="2" |
! rowspan="2" |
! rowspan="2" |
! rowspan="2" |Player
! colspan="2" |Total
! colspan="2" |MLS
! colspan="2" |Playoffs
! colspan="2" |U.S. Open Cup
! colspan="2" |Champions Cup
! colspan="2" |SuperLiga
! colspan="3" |Champions League
|-
!style="width:30px;"|!!style="width:30px;"|!!style="width:30px;"|!!style="width:30px;"|!!style="width:30px;"|!!style="width:30px;"|!!style="width:30px;"|!!style="width:30px;"|!!style="width:30px;"|!!style="width:30px;"|!!style="width:30px;"|!!style="width:30px;"|!!style="width:30px;"|!!style="width:30px;"|
|-
|1||GK||||align=left|||1||0||0||0||0||0||0||0||0||0||0||0||1||0
|-
|2||DF||||align=left|||9||3||6||2||2||0||0||0||0||0||0||0||1||1
|-
|3||MF||||align=left|||0||0||0||0||0||0||0||0||0||0||0||0||0||0
|-
|4||DF||||align=left|||3||0||2||0||0||0||0||0||0||0||1||0||0||0
|-
|5||FW||||align=left|||0||0||0||0||0||0||0||0||0||0||0||0||0||0
|-
|6||MF||||align=left|||1||0||0||0||0||0||1||0||0||0||0||0||0||0
|-
|7||FW||||align=left|||3||0||1||0||0||0||1||0||1||0||0||0||0||0
|-
|8||MF||||align=left|||4||0||3||0||0||0||0||0||0||0||0||0||1||0
|-
|9||MF||||align=left|||5||0||2||0||2||0||0||0||0||0||0||0||1||0
|-
|10||FW||||align=left|||2||1||1||1||0||0||0||0||0||0||0||0||1||0
|-
|10||FW||||align=left|||2||0||1||0||0||0||1||0||0||0||0||0||0||0
|-
|11||MF||||align=left|||3||0||2||0||0||0||0||0||0||0||1||0||0||0
|-
|13||MF||||align=left|||9||0||6||0||0||0||0||0||1||0||2||0||0||0
|-
|14||MF||||align=left|||8||1||6||0||0||0||0||0||1||0||0||1||1||0
|-
|16||DF||||align=left|||2||0||1||0||0||0||0||0||0||0||0||0||1||0
|-
|17||MF||||align=left|||0||0||0||0||0||0||0||0||0||0||0||0||0||0
|-
|18||GK||||align=left|||3||0||2||0||1||0||0||0||0||0||0||0||0||0
|-
|19||MF||||align=left|||1||0||0||0||0||0||0||0||0||0||0||0||1||0
|-
|20||MF||||align=left|||6||0||3||0||0||0||0||0||0||0||1||0||2||0
|-
|21||FW||||align=left|||0||0||0||0||0||0||0||0||0||0||0||0||0||0
|-
|22||MF||||align=left|||6||0||3||0||0||0||1||0||0||0||0||0||2||0
|-
|23||MF||||align=left|||1||0||0||0||0||0||1||0||0||0||0||0||0||0
|-
|24||DF||||align=left|||5||0||3||0||0||0||0||0||1||0||1||0||0||0
|-
|25||FW||||align=left|||2||0||2||0||0||0||0||0||0||0||0||0||0||0
|-
|26||MF||||align=left|||3||0||1||0||0||0||0||0||0||0||1||0||1||0
|-
|27||MF||||align=left|||2||0||2||0||0||0||0||0||0||0||0||0||0||0
|-
|30||GK||||align=left|||0||0||0||0||0||0||0||0||0||0||0||0||0||0
|-
|32||DF||||align=left|||8||0||6||0||0||0||0||0||2||0||0||0||0||0
|-
|99||FW||||align=left|||0||0||0||0||0||0||0||0||0||0||0||0||0||0

Clean sheets 
{| class="wikitable" style="text-align:center;"
|+
!Rank!!Nat.!!Player!!MLS!!Playoffs!!U.S. Open Cup!!Champions Cup!!SuperLiga!!Champions League!!Total
|-
|1||||Pat Onstad||7||0||0||2||2||2
!13
|-
|2||||Tony Caig||3||0||0||0||0||0
!3
|-
! colspan="3" |Total!!10!!0!!0!!2!!2!!2!!16

Honors and awards

MLS Player of the Week

MLS Goal of the Week

Annual

Dynamo team awards

Kits 
Supplier: Adidas / Sponsor: Amigo Energy

References

External links
 2008 Schedule

Houston Dynamo FC seasons
Houston Dynamo
Hou
Houston Dynamo